Velva Elaine Rudd (1910 – December 9, 1999) was an American botanist, specializing in tropical legumes. She worked as a curator at the Smithsonian Institution's National Museum of Natural History and also conducted research at the herbarium at California State University, Northridge.

Early life
Velva Elaine Rudd was born in 1910 in Fargo, North Dakota.

Education and career
Velva Rudd wrote her master's thesis at North Dakota Agricultural College on Euphorbia virgata (leafy spurge). The thesis is titled An ecological study of leafy spurge and was completed in 1932. In 1953 she received her Ph.D. in botany from George Washington University with a dissertation titled The American Species of Aeschynomene. She was an assistant curator from 1948 to 1959 and a curator from 1959 to 1973 in the Department of Botany, United States National Herbarium Smithsonian Institution of Washington, DC. She had started as a technician at the Smithsonian under Kittie Fenley Parker. Rudd specialized in Fabaceae and wrote more than 70 papers on the taxonomy of tropical species of legumes. Her contributions include a six-part monograph published from 1955 to 1968 in Contributions from the United States National Herbarium; the monograph deals with seven genera: Aeschynomene, Ateleia, Chaetocalyx, Cyathostegia, Dussia, Nissolia, and Ormosia. In 1973 she retired as a curator of the National Herbarium. She became a Research Fellow in the Department of Biology of the California State University, Northridge until her death. Her field work was carried out in many tropical locations, including Mexico, Costa Rica, Brazil, Venezuela, and Sri Lanka.

Rudd is the namesake for six species of legumes and the genus Ruddia. North Dakota State University's Department of Biological Sciences sponsors an annual Dr. Velva E. Rudd Scholarship Award for botany juniors or seniors.

Eponyms
The Mexican genus of legumes Ruddia Yakovlev 1971 is named in her honor, as well as several species of legumes:
 (Fabaceae) Acacia ruddiae D.H.Janzen (from Costa Rica)
 (Fabaceae) Dioclea ruddiae R.H.Maxwell (from Venezuela)
 (Fabaceae) Nissolia ruddiae Cruz Durán & M.Sousa 
 (Fabaceae) Ormosia ruddiana Yakovlev (from Minas Gerais, Brazil)
 (Melastomataceae) Clidemia ruddae Wurdack (from Mexico)
 (Mimosoideae) Vachellia ruddiae (D.H.Janzen) Seigler & Ebinger

Taxa named by Rudd
 Paramachaerium krukovii Rudd (from western Brazil)
 Paramachaerium schunkei Rudd (from Peru)
 with Annetta Mary Carter: Acacia kelloggiana A.M.Carter & Rudd

with Mario Sousa
 Styphnolobium burseroides M.Sousa & Rudd
 Styphnolobium caudatum M.Sousa & Rudd (native to Nicaragua)
 Styphnolobium conzattii (Standl.) M.Sousa & Rudd
 Styphnolobium monteviridis M.Sousa & Rudd (native to Central America)
 Styphnolobium parviflorum M.Sousa & Rudd
 Styphnolobium protantherum M.Sousa & Rudd
 Styphnolobium sporadicum M.Sousa & Rudd

References

External links 
Specimens collected and/or identified by Rudd at Bionomia

1910 births
1999 deaths
American botanists
American women botanists
North Dakota State University alumni
George Washington University alumni
Smithsonian Institution people
California State University, Northridge people
People from Fargo, North Dakota
American scientists
20th-century American non-fiction writers
20th-century American women writers